Kumi District is a district in the Eastern Region of Uganda. The town of Kumi hosts the district headquarters.

Location
Kumi District is bordered by Katakwi District to the north, Nakapiripirit District to the northeast, Bukedea District to the east, Pallisa District to the south, and Ngora District to the west. The 'chief town' in the district is Kumi, which is located approximately }, by road, southeast of Soroti, the largest town in Teso sub-region. The coordinates of the district are:01 30N, 33 57E.

Population
In 1991, the national population census estimated the population of the district at about 102,030. The 2002 national census estimated the district population  at approximately 165,400. The annual population growth rate in the district is given as 4.5%. In 2012, the population of Kumi District was estimated at about 255,500. The table below illustrates how the district population has grown between 2002 until 2012. All numbers are estimates.

Transport
Kumi District is served by a road transport networks consisting of one major highway and several other streets. The quality of the road network has been influenced by UNRA. People make use of commercial buses to get around. Prices of bus tickets fluctuate during the holiday season.

See also
 Kumi
 Teso sub-region
 Railway stations in Uganda
 Eastern Region, Uganda
 Districts of Uganda

References

 
Teso sub-region
Districts of Uganda
Eastern Region, Uganda